The 1984 Gator Bowl game was a post-season college football bowl game between the #7 South Carolina Gamecocks and the #9 Oklahoma State Cowboys. It was the 40th edition of the bowl game.  This was the first meeting of two top ten teams in the Gator Bowl with the 1987 Gator Bowl being the only other such occasion when #9 South Carolina lost to #7 LSU.

Background
The Gamecocks had recovered from a 5-6 season in 1983 to compile a 10-1 record during the regular season, Coach Morrison's second at South Carolina.  The Gamecocks started the season 9-0 and rose to #2 in the country after defeating #11 Florida State on November 10, 1984.  However, an upset loss at Navy the following week knocked the Gamecocks from Orange Bowl consideration and whipped out the National Championship aspirations.  The Gamecocks would bounce back with a come from behind 22-21 victory at Clemson to finish the regular season 10-1 and earn the Gator Bowl bid.  During the season South Carolina defeated #12 Georgia and #11 Florida State at home along with road wins at Notre Dame and N.C. State.  The 10 win regular season was a first in school history and would not be equaled until 2011.

As for the Cowboys (in their first season under Coach Jones), they started the season with a victory over #12 Arizona State that made them rise to #13 by the following week. After a 4-0 start, they lost to #8 Nebraska, but won their next five games to set up a pivotal game versus #2 Oklahoma. However, they lost 24-14, while finishing in 2nd place in the Big Eight Conference. This was their third bowl game of the decade.

Game summary

First Quarter

 OSU - Thurman Thomas 1-yard run (Larry Roach kick) 8:16 in 1st

Second Quarter

 OSU - Rusty Hilger 6-yard pass from Thomas (kick failed) 9:39 in 2nd

Third Quarter

 USC - Chris Wade 24-yard pass from Quinton Lewis (Scott Hagler kick) 7:36 in 3rd
 
 USC - Ira Hillary 57-yard pass from Mike Hold (Hagler kick) 2:44 in 3rd

Fourth Quarter

 OSU - Barry Hanna 25-yard pass from Hilger (Jamie Harris pass from Hilger) 1:04 in 4th

On the Cowboy side, Thomas rushed 155 yards on 32 carries, while Hilger threw 21-of-41 for 205 yards and one interception and a touchdown. On the Gamecock side, Hold threw 7-of-21 for 170 yards while Quinton Lewis rushed for 26 yards on 6 carries. The Cowboys managed to outgain the Gamecocks in yards by 78, but had 3 turnovers to the Gamecocks' 1. The Cowboys had 21 first downs, 165 rushing yards, 211 passing, and 3 penalties for 21 yards, while the Gamecocks had 15 first down, 104 rushing yards, 194 passing yards, and 5 penalties for 38 yards.

Aftermath
In 1985 South Carolina slipped to 5-6 and did not qualify for a bowl game.  Their next bowl appearance would be back in Jacksonville for the 1987 Gator Bowl.  The Gamecocks, which were still independent, would fall to SEC power LSU 30-13.  Coach Morrison would eventually serve as South Carolina's coach from 1983-1988 compiling a record of 39-28-2 and leading the Gamecocks to three bowl appearances (also 1988 Liberty Bowl). Morrison would die of a heart attack on February 5, 1989 and be replaced by Sparky Woods.  South Carolina would be invited to join the SEC in 1990 and joined the league during the 1991-92 year with the exception of football which began conference play in 1992. The program's first bowl victory would come during the 1994 season when they defeated West Virginia in the Carquest Bowl 24-21 on January 2, 1995.

As for the Cowboys, they made the Gator Bowl in 1985, though they lost 23-34 to Florida State and finished 8-4. Coach Jones would remain at Oklahoma State for 11 seasons (1984–94) and compiled a record of 62-60-3.  During his tenure the Cowboys played in four bowl games winning three (1987 Sun Bowl and 1988 Holiday Bowl).  During his first five seasons in Stillwater, Jones compiled a record of 44-15 with three bowl wins in four appearances and the school's first three ten-win seasons.  However, his final six seasons resulted in no winning seasons and a record of 18-45-3.  Jones 62 wins is second in school history behind current head coach Mike Gundy.

References

Gator Bowl
Gator Bowl
Oklahoma State Cowboys football bowl games
South Carolina Gamecocks football bowl games
20th century in Jacksonville, Florida
December 1984 sports events in the United States